Rafael "Rafa" Gálvez Cerillo (born 20 May 1993) is a Spanish footballer who plays for CF Intercity as a midfielder.

Club career
Born in Córdoba, Andalusia, Gálvez finished his graduation with local Córdoba CF, making his senior debuts with the reserves in the 2010–11.

On 11 September 2013 Gálvez made his official debut with Córdoba's first team, starting in a 2–2 draw against Deportivo de La Coruña in the season's Copa del Rey. His first league appearance came three days later, in a 3–1 home win over CD Numancia in the Segunda División.

On 7 July 2014 Gálvez moved to another reserve team, Elche CF Ilicitano, after agreeing to a two-year deal. He made his debut with the club's main squad on 15 January of the following year, starting in a 0–4 home loss against FC Barcelona, again in the national cup.

Gálvez made his La Liga debut on 18 January 2015, coming on as a late substitute for Mario Pašalić in a 1–0 home win against Levante UD. On 25 August he returned to Córdoba, now with the main squad.

On 20 July 2016 Gálvez rescinded with the Verdiblancos, and signed for Albacete Balompié just hours later. On 17 July 2018, he agreed to a three-year contract with CD Castellón, after terminating his contract with Alba.

References

External links
Castellón official profile 

1993 births
Living people
Spanish footballers
Footballers from Andalusia
Association football midfielders
La Liga players
Segunda División players
Primera Federación players
Segunda División B players
Tercera División players
Córdoba CF B players
Córdoba CF players
Elche CF Ilicitano footballers
Elche CF players
Albacete Balompié players
CD Castellón footballers
CF Intercity players